Prolyctus is a genus of dry bark beetles in the family Bothrideridae. There is one described species in Prolyctus, P. exaratus.

References

Further reading

 

Bothrideridae
Articles created by Qbugbot
Coccinelloidea genera